Vellore district is one of the 38 districts in the Tamil Nadu state of India. It is one of the eleven districts that form the north region of Tamil Nadu. Vellore city is the headquarters of this district. As of 2011, the district had a population of 1,614,242  with a sex ratio of 1,007 females for every 1,000 males. In 2017 Vellore district ranked eleventh in list of districts in Tamil Nadu by Human Development Index.

The Government of India recently included Vellore city in its prestigious smart city project, along with 26 other cities.

History

Men from the Vellore District fought in the British India Army and sacrificed their lives in the World Wars. This is recorded in the clock tower in the long bazaar at Vellore, raised in 1920, where an inscription reads "Vellore – From this Village 277 men went to the Great war 1914–18, of them 14 gave up their lives".

On 30 September 1989 the district was again split into Tiruvannamalai-Sambuvarayar (present-day Tiruvannamalai) and North Arcot Ambedkar districts. North Arcot Ambedkar District was renamed Vellore District in 1996.

On 15 August 2019, the district was trifurcated into Vellore, Tirupattur and Ranipet districts.

Demographics

According to 2011 census, Vellore district had a population of 1,614,242 with a sex ratio of 1,007 females for every 1,000 males, much above the national average of 929. A total of 432,550 were under the age of six, constituting 222,460 males and 210,090 females. Scheduled Castes and Scheduled Tribes accounted for 21.85% and 1.85% of the population, respectively. The average literacy of the district was 70.47%, compared to the national average of 72.99%.

The district had 929,281 households. There were 1,689,330 workers, comprising 153,211 cultivators, 254,999 main agricultural labourers, 106,906 in household industries, 845,069 other workers, 329,145 marginal workers, 21,897 marginal cultivators, 136,956 marginal agricultural labourers, 29,509 marginal workers in household industries and 140,783 other marginal workers.

Politics  

|}

Administrative divisions and politics

Vellore is one of the 38 districts of Tamil Nadu and is administered by the Vellore District Collectorate. The present collector of Vellore district Kumaravel Pandian.

Transportation
Two National Highways — NH 4 (Mumbai – Chennai) and NH 46 (Krishnagiri – Ranipet) — used to connect parts of the district to other parts of the country before renumbering of national highways in 2010. The former NH 4 and NH 46 is now renumbered as NH 48.

These highways are important connecting roads for vehicles especially travelling to Chennai from Bangalore and Coimbatore.

Railway network in Vellore district comes under the Southern Railways, with Vellore Katpadi Junction, Vellore Cantonment Junction and Gudiyatham forming the major railway junctions. There are many small railway stations for the passenger and local train stops. There is a domestic airport which is not in use; the nearest international/domestic airport is located at Chennai.

Tourism

The Vellore Fort is the primary tourist attraction in the district headquarters Vellore. Vellore Fort is the most prominent landmark. During British rule, Tipu Sultan's family and the last king of Sri Lanka, Vikrama Rajasinha, were held as royal prisoners in the fort. It houses a church, a mosque and a Hindu temple, the latter known for its carvings. The first rebellion against British rule erupted at this fort in 1806, and it witnessed the massacre of the Vijayanagara royal family of Emperor Sriranga Raya.

The Golden Temple Vellore of Sripuram (Tamil: ஸ்ரீபுரம்) is a spiritual park situated at the foot of a small range of green hills in a place known as "Malaikodi". The temple is between Vellore-Odugathur state highway and at the southern end of the city of Vellore, at Tirumalaikodi. The temple with gold covering, has intricate work done by artisans specializing in temple art using gold.

Yelagiri is a hill station located in Tirupattur district of the Vaniyambadi-Tirupattur road at an altitude of 1,410.6 metres above mean sea level and spread across 30 km2.

Cuisine

Vellore Wheat Halwa
Halwa made from whole wheat flour or atta is a popular sweet made in North India. Vellore region's Halwa is the most popular one after North Indian Halwa. Makkan Peda is also considered to be another popular sweet in Vellore.

See also
 Economy of Vellore
 List of educational institutions in Vellore
 List of districts of Tamil Nadu
 Thuthipattu

References

External links

Vellore district marked on OpenStreetMap
Vellore District official web site

 
Districts of Tamil Nadu
States and territories established in 1989
1989 establishments in Tamil Nadu